Joseph A. Bradshaw (1860–1933) was an English football manager who managed Stoke.

Career
Bradshaw was born in Stoke-upon-Trent and took over from Harry Lockett as Stoke manager in June 1890. Stoke had just finished bottom of the Football League for the second time and failed to be re-elected, instead joining the Football Alliance. Whilst Stoke had struggled to compete in the League they found the Alliance easy ending the 1890–91 season as champions with just two defeats and re-claimed their place in the Football League. But halfway through the 1891–92 campaign with the team struggling, he left his position to be replaced by Arthur Reeves.

Managerial statistics

Honours
 Football Alliance champions: 1890–91

References

External links
 Stoke City managers at stokecityfc.com

1860 births
1933 deaths
English football managers
Stoke City F.C. managers
English Football League managers